Jorge Ariel De Maio (born 7 September 1982) is an Argentine professional footballer who plays as a left-back for Colegiales.

Career
De Maio's career started with Colegiales in Primera C Metropolitana. The club won the 2002–03 league title, therefore gaining promotion to Primera B Metropolitana; though they'd be instantly relegated back down. In 2005, after three goals in twenty-seven appearances for Colegiales, De Maio moved to fellow fourth tier team Acassuso. He appeared forty-two times in two seasons, on the way to experiencing his second career promotion in 2006–07. He remained in Boulogne Sur Mer for two further campaigns, prior to leaving in 2009 to Tristán Suárez. On 30 June 2010, Comunicaciones signed De Maio. Ninety-four matches came across four years.

Primera B Metropolitana team Villa Dálmine became De Maio's fifth club in June 2014. He made his debut on 8 August versus Almirante Brown, which was followed by his first goal on his sixtieth appearance in a 6–4 loss to Nueva Chicago in April 2016. After four seasons, three of which in Primera B Nacional after 2014 promotion, with Villa Dálmine, De Maio subsequently spent the 2017–18 campaign in Primera B Metropolitana with Talleres. On 4 July 2018, De Maio completed a return to Colegiales.

Career statistics
.

Honours
Colegiales
Primera C Metropolitana: 2002–03

Acassuso
Primera C Metropolitana: 2006–07

References

External links

1982 births
Living people
People from Vicente López Partido
Argentine footballers
Association football defenders
Primera C Metropolitana players
Primera B Metropolitana players
Primera Nacional players
Club Atlético Colegiales (Argentina) players
Club Atlético Acassuso footballers
CSyD Tristán Suárez footballers
Club Comunicaciones footballers
Villa Dálmine footballers
Talleres de Remedios de Escalada footballers
Sportspeople from Buenos Aires Province